Paula Angélica Hernández Olmos (born 13 April 1972) is a Mexican politician from the Institutional Revolutionary Party. From 2009 to 2012 she served as Deputy of the LXI Legislature of the Mexican Congress representing Hidalgo.

References

1972 births
Living people
People from Pachuca
Women members of the Chamber of Deputies (Mexico)
Institutional Revolutionary Party politicians
21st-century Mexican politicians
21st-century Mexican women politicians
Deputies of the LXI Legislature of Mexico
Members of the Chamber of Deputies (Mexico) for Hidalgo (state)
Politicians from Hidalgo (state)
Monterrey Institute of Technology and Higher Education alumni